Bernard Johann Heinrich  Koenen (17 February 1889 – 30 April 1964) was a German politician.

Between 1953 and 1958 he was the East German ambassador to Czechoslovakia.

Life

Early years
Koenen was born in Hamburg, the son of a carpenter-joiner and a cook. His father was a Socialist activist who participated in the founding of the Second International in Paris five months after his birth. By the turn of the century his father was a leading member of the Social Democratic Party. On 17 January 1906 they were among an estimated 80,000 people in Hamburg to take part in Germany's first ever mass-political protest march, protesting an electoral system which privileged the upper classes at the expense of the working class; Bernard Koenen distributed leaflets at the march.

On leaving school Koenen had embarked on an apprenticeship as a Machinist-Fitter and in 1906 joined the German Metal Workers' Union. The next year he turned 18 and joined the Social Democratic Party (SPD). His skills evidently made him readily employable and a period of travelling followed, taking in Lausanne, Brussels, Lille, and Tunisia, where, in Bizerta, he was among those who founded the Socialist Party in Tunisia. He undertook his military service between 1910 and 1912 and then returned to working abroad in industry. He was called up into the army in 1914, but released from military service in 1916 on account of "anti-military activities". By 1917 he had relocated to Leuna in Saxony-Anhalt where he worked as an electrician. In 1917 he joined the break-away Independent Social Democratic Party (USPD) which had split primarily on account of the mainstream SPD's continuing support for the war. During the November Revolution, Koenen was deputy leader of the Workers' Council at the Leuna Chemicals Plant where he was then working.

Weimar Germany
In 1923 he joined the party's national leadership. From 1922 till 1933 he also sat as a member of the regional legislative assembly (Landtag) for Saxony. Factionalism continued to be a feature of left-wing politics during the 1920s, and from the middle of the decade Koenen was identified with the so-called Conciliator faction (Versöhnler), which led in 1929 to his being relieved of some of his party offices by the party leader, Ernst Thälmann.

Nazi Germany
In January 1933, the NSDAP (Nazi Party) took power and set about establishing one-party government in Germany. Leading members of the Communist party were particular targets. On 12 February 1933, during the course of the Eisleben  (Bloody Sunday) Nazi propaganda march, several Communist leaders were killed; Koenen, however, was merely assaulted and badly injured by SA members, as a result of which he lost an eye. For the next few months, with a warrant out for his arrest, he was concealed in a private clinic by a doctor who was sympathetic to the Communist cause.

Exile
In May 1933, along with several other fugitive Communists, he managed to get to the Saarland, the only part of Germany still under foreign military occupation following the end of the First World War. In July 1933 Koenen emigrated to the Soviet Union, where he would remain till 1945. Initially he worked as the Organisation Secretary of the International Red Aid organisation. Then, in 1937, he was caught up in Stalin's purges and detained by the NKVD till 1939.   However, in 1940 he was again trusted to undertake assignments. Between 1941 and 1943 he worked for the "Deutschen Volkssender" ("German People's Radio") radio station, transferring in August 1943 to Radio "Freies Deutschland" ("Free Germany"). He started to work for the Soviet sponsored National Committee for a Free Germany in 1943, which was also the year in which he joined the Central Committee of the (exiled) German Communist Party.

Postwar

Koenen returned in 1945 to the Soviet occupation zone in what remained of Germany.   In April 1946 he became a founder member of the Socialist Unity Party of Germany (SED / Sozialistische Einheitspartei Deutschlands). The creation of the party came about through a contentious merger, in the Soviet zone, of the Communist Party and the more moderately left-wing Social Democratic Party. The merger was in theory one of equals, but by the time the German Democratic Republic was formally founded in 1949 it was noteworthy that the positions of party influence and leadership were almost all held by men who, like Koenen, had been members of the Communist Party until 1946. With right wing policies discredited by twelve disastrous years of Nazi government, the de facto neutralising of the moderate left allowed a return to one-party government, but this time the template had been prepared, in some detail, in Moscow. During the late 1940s, Koenen worked as a party officer in the Halle region. Between 1946 and 1952 he was also a member and leader of the SED group in the regional legislature of Saxony-Anhalt.

At the national level, Koenen was a member of the Party Central Committee from 1946 till his death in 1964.  Under the Soviet system, on which the East German constitution was modelled, the responsibilities of government ministers were restricted to implementing the decisions of the Party Central Committee, while a Single List voting system ensured that the National Legislative Assembly (Volkskammer) was also controlled by the ruling SED (that is to say, by its Central Committee). In terms of power and influence Koenen's Central Committee membership was therefore of greater significance than membership of regional or national legislatures, though in practice there were plenty of Central Committee members who simultaneously held office in national or regional legislatures and/or as government ministers. Koenen himself combined Central Committee membership with membership of the national legislature (Volkskammer), although it was reported that he had declined ministerial office in order to avoid having to cut back on party duties.

From 1946 till 1964 Koenen also held a seat in the National Legislative Assembly. However, in 1952 he lost his seat and leadership position in the regional legislature of Saxony-Anhalt when regional legislatures were abolished in the context of a wider programme of regional government reform. Partly as a consequence of those reforms, local and municipal councils became more important. Between 1952 and 1953, and again, in succession to Franz Bruk, from 1958 till 1963 Koenen served as First Secretary to the SED Regional Leadership (Berzirksleitung) in Halle.

From 1953 to 1958 Koenen was appointed as his country's ambassador to neighbouring Czechoslovakia, an important post, succeeding .

Between 1960 and 1964 he was a member of the State Council of East Germany.

Outside politics, he also worked as a teacher and journalist.

Family
Koenen's elder brother, Wilhelm Koenen (1886-1963), was also a German Communist politician.

Koenen married Frieda Bockentien (1890-1968) during the First World War. Their sons Victor and Alfred both joined the Red Army in order to fight Nazi Germany. Viktor (1920-1942) was killed over or in Poland in 1942. (There are conflicting reports as to how he died.) Alfred (1921-1995) survived the war and had a career as an army officer and, later, as a diplomat.

References

External links

1889 births
1964 deaths
Politicians from Hamburg
Social Democratic Party of Germany politicians
Independent Social Democratic Party politicians
Communist Party of Germany politicians
Members of the Central Committee of the Socialist Unity Party of Germany
Members of the State Council of East Germany
Members of the Provisional Volkskammer
Members of the 1st Volkskammer
Members of the 2nd Volkskammer
Members of the 3rd Volkskammer
Members of the 4th Volkskammer
Ambassadors of East Germany to Czechoslovakia
Members of the Landtag of Saxony-Anhalt
Refugees from Nazi Germany in the Soviet Union
National Committee for a Free Germany members
Recipients of the Patriotic Order of Merit in gold